Elm Hill is a community in Hampstead Parish, New Brunswick, Canada. It is significant as the last surviving Black Canadian community in New Brunswick.

History

Elm Hill was established by black Loyalists from Virginia in 1806, as one of Canada's earliest black communities. Throughout the 1800s, the community enjoyed a period of relative prosperity, as its remoteness allowed the residents to develop their economy free from outside interference. Located on the St. John River between Saint John and Fredericton, Elm Hill functioned well while the steamers plied the river, stopping there to transport people and products. Once the railroad replaced the river as the highway, however, the community's isolation worked against it. Elm Hill had been a self-sufficient farming community until the 1960s, when many area residents moved to urban areas for better opportunities. Those remaining were not able to keep up the farms, and decline set in. Elm Hill once supported a post office, a store, two churches (Pentecostal and Baptist), and a school although those are all now closed.

As of the 2016 census, the area is still home to 25 residents, many involved in small-scale farming operations or employed in government jobs.

The community was previously known as Otnabog (1854–1893), Upper Otnabog (1876–1911), and Pleasant Villa (1911–1933), before the name was changed back to Elm Hill.

See also
List of communities in New Brunswick
Black Nova Scotians
Black Loyalists
Black Canadians in New Brunswick

References 

Black Canadian culture in New Brunswick
Communities in Queens County, New Brunswick
Black Canadian settlements
Local service districts of Queens County, New Brunswick